Loupian Roman villa is in the village of Loupian in the Hérault département of France, between Montpellier and Béziers, the heart of Gallia Narbonensis. Excavations on a three-hectare site south of the village have revealed remains of a Roman farm villa with extensive 2nd-century Gallo-Roman mosaics. The site was occupied for more than 600 years.

Originally a modest farmstead built a few kilometres south of the Via Domitia, on the hillside overlooking the Bassin de Thau, it rapidly prospered and grew. During the early Empire, in the 1st and 2nd centuries, the villa was a large patrician residence with thermal springs. The main agricultural activity was viticulture, for which a storehouse capable of holding 1,500 hl of wine was constructed. This period also saw the building of a small port on the northern shore of the Bassin de Thau, as well as pottery workshops producing amphorae for the transportation of wine.

In the 5th century, the villa was completely rebuilt and the owner's home turned into a small mansion. The thirteen ground floor rooms are covered in multicoloured, highly decorated mosaics. The potteries by now were producing not just amphorae but also household pottery.

The mosaics
The springs from the original house were decorated with 2nd-century mosaics. However, those in the later villa are unique inasmuch as there is no other villa in which the influences of two such geographically separated countries, Aquitaine and Syria, have come together. This oddity is perhaps explained by the eclectic taste of the owner, or possibly simply from a desire to have the work completed quickly. In theory, a team of four mosaic workers would take a whole year to cover a 500 m2 floor. At Loupian, two teams working together could have laid the original 450 m2 in between six and eighteen months.

Visitor information
A 1,000 m2 building protects the remains of the villa and its mosaics. Guided tours of the site and its museum are available, in French, every day in summer and on Wednesdays and weekends outside the season (closed in January). Tours in English are available at certain times.

External links
Villa, villae in roman Gaul. The Villa Loupian, a Gallo-Roman estate in Languedoc  with 3D reconstructions and virtual visit of the mosaics
Official site with practical information 

Roman villas in France
Museums in Hérault
Museums of ancient Rome in France
Gallia Narbonensis